The Women's 800 metre freestyle competition of the 2019 African Games was held on 24 August 2019.

Records
Prior to the competition, the existing world and championship records were as follows.

Results

Final 

The final was started on 24 August.

References 

Women's 800 metre freestyle
2019 in women's swimming